Dream of You may refer to:

Albums 
 Dream of You (Sharon Corr album), 2010
 Dream of You (Helen Merrill album), 1957

Songs 
 "Dream of You" (1934 song), a 1934 jazz standard first recorded by Jimmie Lunceford
 "Dream of You" (Camila Cabello song), from the album Romance (2019)
 "Dream of You" (Chungha and R3hab song), a 2020 song by Chungha and R3hab
 "Dream of You" (Schiller song)", 2001

Other uses in music 
 Dream of You Tour, a 2011 tour by Sharon Corr